Fort Gaddis is the oldest known building in Fayette County, Pennsylvania and the second oldest log cabin in Western Pennsylvania. Fort Gaddis was built about 1769-74 by Colonel Thomas Gaddis who was in charge of the defense of the region, and his home was probably designated as a site for community meetings and shelter in times of emergency, hence the term "Fort Gaddis," probably a 19th-century appellation. It is a 1 1/2-story, 1-room log structure measuring 26 feet long and 20 feet wide.

During the Whiskey Rebellion a Liberty Pole was erected at the house during a rally in support of the rebel cause. The choice of this site for a political demonstration indicates its importance as a focal point for community expression. The fact that all the additions to the building were removed in the early twentieth century in respect for the section contemporary with the American Revolution and Whiskey Rebellion is evidence of the building's longstanding and continuing status and power as a community symbol.

Fort Gaddis was built near the Catawba Trail, an important north-south route that extended from New York to Tennessee and passed through Uniontown, Pennsylvania and Morgantown, West Virginia. In the 19th century the trail became locally known as the Morgantown Road. It is now Old U.S. Route 119. About 2 miles north on this road is Uniontown, the Fayette County, Pennsylvania seat, settled in the late 1760s and founded in July 1776 as Beeson's Mill.

History fans and researchers should be aware that, depending on which sources are consulted, Fort Gaddis can also be known as the "Thomas Gaddis Homestead", the "Thomas Gaddis House" or "Gaddis' Fort".

It was added to the National Register of Historic Places in 1974 as the Thomas Gaddis Homestead.

Gallery

References

Dutko Leonelli, Victoria. Images of America, Around Uniontown. Arcadia Publishing, 2003.
Hopkins, G.M. Atlas of the County of Fayette and the State of Pennsylvania. G.M. Hopkins & Co., 1872.
Jordan, Terry G. The American Backwoods Frontier: An Ethical and Ecological Interpretation. The Johns Hopkins University Press, 1992.
Jordan-Bychkov, Terry G. American Log Buildings: An Old World Heritage. University of North Carolina Press, 1985.
Lynch, Thomas. Report of the Commission to Locate the Site of the Frontier Forts of Pennsylvania. Clarence M. Busch, 1896.
Mulkearn & Pugh. A Traveler's Guide to Historic Western Pennsylvania. University of Pittsburgh Press, 1954.
Stotz, Charles Morse. Architectural Heritage of Early Western Pennsylvania. University of Pittsburgh Press, 1936.
Wallace, Kim E. Historic American Buildings Survey (America's Industrial Heritage Project). National Park Service, 1989.
Wallace, Paul A. W. Indian Paths of Pennsylvania. PHMC, 1987.

External links

Fort Gaddis - Pennsylvania Historical Markers on Waymarking.com
Excavations at Fort Gaddis, from the California University of Pennsylvania
Thomas Gaddis House, 300 yards east of old U.S. Route 119 near intersection of Route 859, Uniontown, Fayette County, PA: 9 photos, 15 data pages, and 2 photo caption pages at Historic American Buildings Survey
"Hart's History and Directory of the Three Towns ... Brownsville, Bridgeport, West Brownsville"
"A History of Uniontown: the County seat of Fayette County, Pennsylvania"
Map of Route 119/Route 857  "Old Morgantown Road/Fairchance Road" Intersection

Historic American Buildings Survey in Pennsylvania
Gaddis
Gaddis
Houses in Fayette County, Pennsylvania
Tourist attractions in Fayette County, Pennsylvania
National Register of Historic Places in Fayette County, Pennsylvania